The 1886 Costa Rican general election was held on 4 April 1886. After the death of Próspero Fernández Oreamuno in March 1885, Bernardo Soto Alfaro took over the presidency temporarily for the remainder of the term. Soto was a thirty-year-old young man who had to command the country in the war against Guatemala that sought to re-establish the Federal Republic of Central America. Soto was a freemason and liberal, belonging to "The Olympus", a group of liberal intellectuals who would have a great influence on Costa Rican politics and many would hold the Presidency of the Republic.

Soto managed to prevent through various tricks the candidacy of Víctor Guardia Gutiérrez, brother of the late dictator Tomás Guardia Gutiérrez, becoming sole and unanimous candidate in a two-degree type of election in which all male citizens allowed by law choose second-degree electors who selected the President.

Results
Second grade electors

References

Elections in Costa Rica
1886 elections in Central America
Single-candidate elections
1886 in Costa Rica